Roncalese (in Basque: erronkariera, in Roncalese dialect: Erronkariko uskara) is an extinct Basque dialect once spoken in the Roncal Valley in Navarre, Spain. It is a subdialect of Eastern Navarrese in the classification of Koldo Zuazo.  It had been classified as a subdialect of Souletin (otherwise spoken in the province of Soule in France) in the 19th-century classification of Louis Lucien Bonaparte, and as a separate dialect in the early-20th-century classification of Resurrección María de Azkue. The last speaker of the Roncalese, Fidela Bernat, died in 1991.

Roncalese preserves historical nasals which have been lost from other dialects, a fact which has proven valuable in discrediting the aizkora theory (that Basque vocabulary is continuous from the Stone Age).

Text

See also
Basque dialects

References

External links
 Roncalese recordings, Nafarroako Euskararen Mediateka, Euskarabidea, Government of Navarre.

Basque dialects
Navarre culture